Nasonville is a village in Burrillville, Providence County, Rhode Island, United States. It was home to various manufacturers in the 19th century. The village was founded by Leonard Nason in 1825 when he purchased land along the river to found a axe and hoe factory.

References

External links 
 Nasonville Fire Department
 Local Landmarks
 Shrine of the Little Flower (first shrine to St. Theresa in America) - see List of shrines#United States

Villages in Providence County, Rhode Island
Burrillville, Rhode Island
Villages in Rhode Island